Ion Luca Caragiale National College is a high school located at 98 Gheorghe Doja Street, Ploiești, Romania.

The school traces its origins to the boys’ gymnasium that opened in 1864. A first grade of nineteen pupils was quickly joined by a second of eighteen. The first dedicated school building, designed by Alexandru Orăscu, was started in 1865 and completed the following year. In 1866, the school was named for Saints Peter and Paul, after an old church nearby. The gymnasium operated for fourteen years, including during the Romanian War of Independence, when a Russian chapel was installed in the schoolyard beneath a large white tent. The school year was divided into trimesters, each of which ended in an examination. By 1876-1877, there were 23 subjects being taught, divided into twelve departments, each with its own chairman.

The institution became a high school in 1878. A new building, started in 1895, was opened in 1898; it was a source of pride for the city’s residents. In 1944, during World War II, it suffered severe damage as a result of Allied bombing. In 1948, under the new communist regime, the school moved into the Commercial School Palace. With the closure of other institutions, it became the only high school in Ploiești and all of Prahova County. In 1952, for the centenary of his birth, it was renamed for playwright Ion Luca Caragiale. Girls were first admitted in 1956. Under Nicolae Ceaușescu, 12th grade was restored in 1965-1966; in 1977, its stated focus became mathematics and physics. It was declared a national college in 1997.

The current school building, which dates to 1936, is listed as a historic monument by Romania's Ministry of Culture and Religious Affairs, as are its two predecessors.

Alumni
 Fory Etterle
 Remus Opriș 
 Eugen Simion

Notes

External links

 Official site

Historic monuments in Prahova County
Ploiești
Schools in Prahova County
Educational institutions established in 1864
1864 establishments in Romania
National Colleges in Romania
School buildings completed in 1936